This is a list of science fiction television films that did not have a theatrical release, including direct-to-video releases.



1950s–1960s

1970s

Notes

1980s

1990s

2000s

2010s

See also
 List of Sci Fi Channel (United States) programs
 List of science fiction films
 Television movie

References

General reference 

Science Fiction
 
Television films